Theodore Ledyard Cuyler (January 10, 1822 – February 26, 1909) was a leading Presbyterian minister and religious writer in the United States.

Biography

Cuyler was born at Aurora, New York, but his father died before he was five years old. Cuyler graduated from Princeton University in 1841 and from Princeton Theological Seminary in 1846.  He first became a pastor in Burlington, New Jersey.  Successful in reviving the flagging church, he was called in 1853 as pastor of the Market Street Dutch Reformed Church in New York City. He was elected to the American Philosophical Society in 1857. His success at the Market Street Dutch Reformed Church led to Cuyler's installation in 1860 as the pastor of the Park Presbyterian Church in Brooklyn, from which he oversaw the construction of the Lafayette Avenue Presbyterian Church a block away.  Completed in 1862, the church served the largest Presbyterian congregation in the United States. Cuyler's friends and acquaintances included a staggeringly large number of other contemporary notables, including Horatius Bonar, Samuel Hanson Cox, Phillips Brooks, Horace Bushnell, Horace Greeley, James McCosh, Gilbert Haven, Joseph Addison Alexander, Albert Barnes, William E. Dodge, Newman Hall, Richard Salter Storrs, Philip Schaff, Stephen H. Tyng, Joseph Parker (theologian), Charles Spurgeon, Benjamin M. Palmer, D. L. Moody, Charles G. Finney, President Benjamin Harrison, Vice President Henry Wilson, and Prime Minister William Gladstone.

A theological conservative, Cuyler was also an outspoken supporter of the temperance movement and an avid abolitionist. In 1872, Cuyler invited Sarah Smiley, a Quaker, to be the first woman ever to preach from a Presbyterian pulpit. Besides numerous books, Cuyler wrote more than four thousand articles, mostly for the religious press.

Cuyler Gore, a park in Brooklyn, was named for him just before the turn of the 20th century. Cuyler politely declined a proposal that his statue be erected there, instead asking only that the park continue to bear his name and "be always kept as bright and beautiful with flowers as it is now."

Publications
Books:
Stray Arrows (1851)
Sermon on Christian Recreation and Unchristian Amusement (1858)
Intellect, and How to Use it (1863)
The Moral Duty in Total Abstinence (1871)
Thought-Hives (1872)
Heart-life (1871)
Pointed Papers for the Christian Life (1879)
God's Light on Dark Clouds (1882)
Business in Business (1883)
Wayside Springs from the Fountains of Life (1883)
Right to the Point (1884)
Newly Enlisted (1888)
How To Be A Pastor (1890) By the Baker & Taylor Co. (Publisher)
The Cedar Christian (1891)
The Young Preacher (1893)
Beulah-Land; or, Words of Good Cheer to the Old (1896)
Mountain Tops With Jesus (1898)
Well-Built: Plain Talks to Young People (1898)
Recollections of a Long Life (An Autobiography) (1902)
Help and Good Cheer (1902)
Campaigning for Christ (1902)
A Model Christian (1903)
Our Christmas Tides (1904)

See also 
 Cuyler Presbyterian Church

References

External links
 
 
 
 
 

1822 births
1909 deaths
American Presbyterian ministers
19th-century Presbyterian ministers
19th-century American clergy